Galaxias fuscus, the barred galaxias, is a galaxiid of the genus Galaxias, a member of the Mountain Galaxias species complex group of freshwater fish, found in Australia.

Description
Galaxias fuscus is a freshwater fish with the typical bodyform of the genus Galaxias with fins generally larger and more rounded compared to other Galaxiids. Colour is overall yellow-orange to red-orange with distinctive unevenly spaced and variable in number dark to black vertical bars, usually rounded at the top and more pointed at the bottom, an inverted tear drop shape. The number of bars varies from none to about ten, but usually less than seven with the number of bars and spacing often not the same on each side of the fish. The head and upper surfaces of the body above the lateral line are often overlaid with a dusky shading made up of many small dark grey spots. The side bars often have a "halo" surrounding them where the dusky shading is not present, exposing the base body colour.

Distribution

The species is now extinct in previously recorded locations: the lower Rubicon River near Rubicon; Mountain Creek near Kinglake; Whitehouse Creek north east of Marysville); and, Gaffneys Creek near A1 Mine Settlement. Range is limited to areas that are trout free.

Habitat
G. fuscus prefers small, shallow, overgrown and steep moderate to fast-flowing, cool to cold rivers and creeks with a stream bed of bedrock, large and small stones, pebble, gravel and sand. Instream cover consists of large and small woody debris, rocks and tree roots within undercut banks.

Lifecycle/Reproduction
Spawning occurs from late September to early October. The fish can withstand very cold water, below , including stretches above and immediately downstream of the snowline in winter.

Conservation
Protected under the national Environment Protection Biodiversity Conservation Act 1999 and the Victorian Flora and Fauna Guarantee Act 1988.  Listed as endangered under the IUCN Red List.

Utility to humans
Not an angling target due to small size and conservation status.

References

Galaxias
Freshwater fish of Australia
Fish described in 1936